Midnight Runner is a novel by Jack Higgins published in 2002. It is his tenth Sean Dillon novel.

Reviews
"MIDNIGHT RUNNER (Book)." Kirkus Reviews 70.2 (15 Jan. 2002): 65. Abstract: Reviews the book 'Midnight Runner,' by Jack Higgins.
Gannon, Sean. "Midnight Runner (Book)." People 57.16 (29 Apr. 2002): 47. Abstract: Reviews the book 'Midnight Runner,' by Jack Higgins.
Zaleski, Jeff. "MIDNIGHT RUNNER (Book)." Publishers Weekly 249.6 (11 Feb. 2002): 162. Abstract: Reviews the book 'Midnight Runner,' by Jack Higgins.
Harris, Karen. "Midnight Runner (Book)." Booklist 99.5 (Nov. 2002): 515. Abstract: Reviews the audiobook 'Midnight Runner,' by Jack Higgins and read by Patrick MacNee.

Footnotes

2002 British novels
British thriller novels
Novels by Jack Higgins
HarperCollins books